Thomas Speed may refer to:

 Thomas Speed (politician) (1768–1842), U.S. Representative from Kentucky
 Thomas Speed (Quaker) (1623–1703), preacher, merchant and Quaker
 Thomas Speed (cashier), chief cashier of the Bank of England, 1694–99
 Thomas Speed (cricketer) (1843-1896), Barbadian cricketer